Great Britain national cerebral palsy football team is the national cerebral football team for Great Britain that represents the team in international competitions, but primarily the Paralympic Games.  They compete at the 1984, 1992, 2008 and 2012 Summer Paralympics.  Their best performance was in 1984 when they won the bronze medal.

Players 
There have been a number of players for the British squad.

Coaches 
In 2011 and 2012, the team was coached by Lyndon Lynch.

Results 

Great Britain has participated in a number of international tournaments.  At the BT Paralympic World Cup in Manchester in May 2012, Great Britain met Brazil in the finals after defeating Ireland  7–3 in the semi-final. Great Britain finished third at the 2016 Pre-Paralympic Tournament in Salou, Spain after losing to the Netherlands 3 - 2 in the bronze medal game.

Paralympic Games 
Great Britain has participated in 7-a-side football at the Paralympic Games.

2016 Summer Paralympics 
Great Britain secured qualification for Rio by finishing fifth at the 2015 Cerebral Palsy Football World Championships.

The draw for the tournament was held on May 6 at the  2016 Pre Paralympic Tournament in Salou, Spain.  Great Britain was put into Group A with Ukraine, Brazil and Ireland.  The tournament where the draw took place featured 7 of the 8 teams participating in Rio.  It was the last major preparation event ahead of the Rio Games for all teams participating.  Great Britain finished fourth, after losing 2 - 3 to the Netherlands in the 3rd place match.

Going into the Rio Games, England was ranked seventh in the world, while Scotland was ninth, Northern Ireland was thirteenth and Wales was unranked.  No Great Britain team was ranked. On 13 June 2016, the British Paralympic Association announced the selection of the fourteen members of the British 7-a-side squad. The team includes several players from Scotland.  These are FT7 classified players Martin Hickman, Jonathan Paterson and David Porcher.
 Pool A

Paralympic Results

References 

National cerebral palsy football teams
Football 7-a-side teams at the 2012 Summer Paralympics
Football 7-a-side teams at the 2008 Summer Paralympics
Football 7-a-side teams at the 1992 Summer Paralympics
Football 7-a-side teams at the 1984 Summer Paralympics
Great Britain at the Paralympics
Football 7-a-side teams at the 2016 Summer Paralympics
C